Shostak (Ukrainian or Belarusian: Шостак) is a gender-neutral Belarusian and Ukrainian surname. It may refer to:

 Aleksandr Shostak (born 1974), Belarusian gymnast
 Aliaksei Shostak (born 1995), Belarusian-born American trampoline gymnast
 Arthur B. Shostak (born 1937), American sociologist and futurist
 Dean Shostak, American musician
 Eliezer Shostak (1911–2001), Israeli politician
 Frank Shostak, Austrian economist
 Hanna Sobachko-Shostak (1883–1965), Ukrainian folk painter
 John Shostak (died 1971), American politician
 Konstantin Shostak (born 2000), Belarusian ice hockey player
 Marjorie Shostak (1945–1996), American anthropologist
 Robert Shostak, American computer scientist
 Seth Shostak (born 1943), American astronomer

See also
 
Szostak

Belarusian-language surnames
Ukrainian-language surnames